The 2019–20 Vijay Hazare Trophy is the 18th season of the Vijay Hazare Trophy, a List A cricket tournament in India. It is being contested by 38 teams, divided into four groups, with ten teams in Group C. The group stage started on 24 September 2019. The top two teams in Group C progressed to the quarter-finals of the competition.

Seventeen out of the first thirty matches that were scheduled to be played across all four groups were abandoned or finished in a no result. Therefore, the Board of Control for Cricket in India (BCCI) issued a revised schedule for the rain-affected matches.

Following the conclusion of matches played on 10 October 2019, Gujarat and Tamil Nadu, were the first two teams to qualify for the knockout stage of the tournament.

Points table

Fixtures

Round 1

Round 2

Round 3

Round 4

Round 5

Round 6

Round 7

Round 8

Round 9

Round 10

Round 11

Round 12

Round 13

Round 14

Round 15

References

Vijay Hazare Trophy
Vijay Hazare Trophy
Vijay Hazare Trophy